Kastelruth is a comune (municipality) in South Tyrol in northern Italy, about  northeast of the city of Bolzano.

Geography

Kastelruth borders the following municipalities: Barbian, Campitello di Fassa, Völs am Schlern, Lajen, Urtijëi, Waidbruck, Ritten, Santa Cristina Gherdëina and Tiers.

Frazioni
The municipality of Kastelruth contains the frazioni (subdivisions, mainly villages and hamlets)
Seiser Alm (Alpe di Siusi), Pufels (lad. Bula, it. Bulla), Runggaditsch (lad. Roncadic, it. Roncadizza), St. Michael (San Michele Siusi), St. Oswald (Sant'Osvaldo), St. Valentin (San Valentino), St. Vigil (San Vigilio), Tagusens (Tagusa), Tisens (Tisana) and Überwasser (lad. Sureghes, it. Oltretorrente). Seis am Schlern is a località of the comune.

Society

Linguistic distribution
According to the 2011 census, 80.94% of the population speak German, 15.37% Ladin and 3.69% Italian as first language.

Demographic evolution

Notable people 
 Leo Santifaller (1890-1974), historian
 Martino Fill (born 1939) an Italian alpine skier
 Norbert Rier (born 1960), lead singer of the Kastelruther Spatzen
 Christine Novaković (born 1964), banker
 Denise Karbon (born 1980), retired World Cup alpine ski racer
 Peter Fill (born 1982), World Cup alpine ski racer

References

External links

 Homepage of the municipality

Municipalities of South Tyrol